Tom Geißler (born 12 September 1983) is a German former professional footballer who played as a midfielder.

Career
Geißler made his debut on the professional league level in the 2. Bundesliga for SV Wacker Burghausen on 31 January 2004 coming on as a substitute in the 59th minute of a game against Alemannia Aachen.

He ended his career following a season-long stint at SSV Markranstädt in the Oberliga.

References

External links
 

1983 births
Living people
People from Oschatz
People from Bezirk Leipzig
German footballers
Footballers from Saxony
Association football midfielders
Germany under-21 international footballers
Bundesliga players
2. Bundesliga players
FC Sachsen Leipzig players
SV Wacker Burghausen players
1. FSV Mainz 05 players
FC Erzgebirge Aue players
VfL Osnabrück players
TuS Koblenz players
RB Leipzig players
FC Carl Zeiss Jena players